Emir Kobilić, known professionally as Salvatore Ganacci, is a Bosnian-Swedish DJ and record producer. His performances at Tomorrowland in 2018 and 2019 became internet sensations, as did the music video for his song "Horse".

Early life 
Emir Kobilić was born in SR Bosnia and  Herzegovina, SFR Yugoslavia and moved to Stockholm, Sweden. He told an interviewer that his performing name 
Kobilić was nicknamed "Salvatore Ganacci" by his childhood friends while playing football, as his "style of play was very Italian".

Career
He went on to work as a producer. In 2013, Ganacci, together with Sanjin, released his first song, called "Zlatan", inspired by Swedish footballer Zlatan Ibrahimović. In the song itself, he used another alias, called "Youthman". In the following year, Ganacci released his collaboration with Sanjin, and Jillionaire of Major Lazer called "Fresh". In 2015, Ganacci signed a record deal with Sebastian Ingrosso's Refune Music label. He also released a track featuring vocals from Trinidad James entitled "Money in my mattress". MTV News said the accompanying video "will be the weirdest thing you watch all day". In 2018, he released the track "Jook It" with Tujamo.

Ganacci's song "Horse" was released on audio and video in 2019, by Owsla, a label co-owned by Skrillex. It later garnered recognition at the Berlin Music Video Awards and the Grammis. The music video for "Horse" was the overall winner of the Berlin Music Video Awards in 2020, also winning the award for the "Best Concept" category.

The video begins with a group of people in the forest torturing animals, before Ganacci is alerted by an eagle and arrives driving a shoe. He then subjects the torturers to the very punishments they were inflicting on the animals. Billboard commented "it's kind of funny, but mostly it's just bizarre". As of January 2022, the video on OWSLA's official YouTube channel had over 46 million views. Ganacci worked on with director Vedran Rupic and said about the clip "My message is always about love, but I really love to experiment with what love can be." PopMatters listed "Horse" and also Party Favor's "Wasabi" which featured Ganacci in its best dance tracks for 2019.

Ganacci's next authored release was the "Boycycle" EP, which also came with a video. The new song had vocals from Sébastien Tellier  and the video told the story of a being who is half-man, half-motorcycle. Ganacci collaborated again with Rupic to make the video for "Step-Grandma" in 2021. He later received Best Performance in a Video at the UK Music Video Awards.

In 2018, Ganacci performed at Tomorrowland Festival in Belgium and received attention due to his dancing and comedic antics. Journalists from publications such as Billboard, Mixmag and NME gave his performance rave reviews and clips went viral on the internet. He returned to the main stage of Tomorrowland the following year, beginning his set by standing in the crowd booing his own performance. He also played at Electric Daisy Carnival at the Las Vegas Motor Speedway.

Ganacci occasionally posts comedic shorts in his YouTube channel; much like his music videos, these sketches tend to explore the humor in absurdist and surreal situations they depict.

Awards and nominations

References

External links
 Official website
 

1986 births
Swedish DJs
Living people
Reggae fusion artists
Musicians from Stockholm
Swedish record producers
Swedish songwriters
Swedish people of Bosnia and Herzegovina descent
Electronic dance music DJs
Owsla artists
Mad Decent artists
Spinnin' Records artists
Stmpd Rcrds artists
Yugoslav emigrants to Sweden